Hyperaeschrella dentata is a moth of the family Notodontidae first described by George Hampson in 1892. It is found in Sri Lanka.

Host plant includes Nephelium lappaceum.

Subspecies
Hyperaeschrella dentata kosemponica Strand, 1915

References

Moths of Asia
Moths described in 1892
Notodontidae